Glasgow was a burgh constituency of the House of Commons of the Parliament of the United Kingdom from 1832 to 1885. It returned two Member of Parliament (MPs) until 1868, and then three from 1868 to 1885. Elections were held using the bloc vote system.

History 
Until 1832, Glasgow had been one of the parliamentary burghs in the Clyde Burghs constituency (also known as "Glasgow Burghs"), which was abolished by the Representation of the People (Scotland) Act 1832. The Act created the new Glasgow constituency with two seats, which was increased to three by the Representation of the People (Scotland) Act 1868.

Under the Redistribution of Seats Act 1885, the constituency was finally divided into seven new single-seat constituencies, with effect from the 1885 general election:
Glasgow Blackfriars and Hutchesontown
Glasgow Bridgeton
Glasgow Camlachie
Glasgow College
Glasgow Central
Glasgow St Rollox
Glasgow Tradeston

Boundaries

The boundaries of the constituency, as set out in the Representation of the People (Scotland) Act 1832, were-

"From the Point, on the West of the Town, at which the River Kelvin joins the River Clyde, up the River Kelvin to a Point which is distant One hundred and fifty Yards (measured along the River Kelvin) above the Point at which the same is met by the Park Wall which comes down thereto from Woodside Road; thence in a straight Line to a Point on the Great Canal which is distant One hundred Yards (measured along the Great Canal) below Derry Bridge; thence along the Great Canal and the Cut of Junction to the Bridge over the Cut of Junction on the Stirling Road; thence, Eastward, along the Low Garngad Road to a Point which is distant One hundred and fifty Yards (measured along the Low Garngad Road) to the East of the Bridge over the Grimston Burn; thence in a straight Line to a Point on the Road to Edinburgh by Airdrie which is distant One hundred Yards (measured along the said Road to Edinburgh) to the East of the Point at which the same is joined by the Road to Edinburgh through the Village of Westmuir; thence in a straight Line to the Point at which the River Clyde is joined by Harvie's Dyke; thence down the River Clyde to the Point at which the same is joined by the Polmadie Burn; thence up the Polmadie Burn to the Point at which the same is joined by the Little Govan Burn; thence up the Little Govan Burn to the Point at which the same is divided into Two Branches in coming down from Govan Hill; thence in a straight Line to the Eastern Extremity of the Butterbiggins Road; thence along the Butterbiggins Road, and in a Line in continuation of the Direction thereof, to the Kinninghouse Burn; thence in a straight Line to the Sheils Bridge over the Paisley and Androssan Canal; thence in a straight Line to the Point at which the River Clyde is joined by the Plantation Burn; thence down the River Clyde to the Point first described."

Members of Parliament

Election results

Elections in the 1880s

 Caused by Anderson's appointment as Master of the Mint at Melbourne, Australia.

Elections in the 1870s

 Caused by Whitelaw's death.

 

 

 

 Anderson and Cameron stood to speak "for the interests of temperance, working men, religious freedom and reform". The Whig sect of the local party nominated Bolton and Crum, and Kerr represented "the Irish interest" and Roman Catholicism.

Bolton withdrew before the election.

Elections in the 1860s

 

Seat increased to three members

Elections in the 1850s

 
 

 

 Caused by MacGregor's resignation by accepting the office of Steward of the Manor of Northstead

Elections in the 1840s

Elections in the 1830s

 Caused by Cavendish-Bentinck's resignation

 
  
  

 
  

 Caused by Oswald's resignation

 

 Caused by Dunlop's resignation

References 

History of Glasgow
Politics of Glasgow
Historic parliamentary constituencies in Scotland (Westminster)
Constituencies of the Parliament of the United Kingdom established in 1832
Constituencies of the Parliament of the United Kingdom disestablished in 1885